The 2013–14 Louisiana–Lafayette Ragin' Cajuns men's basketball team represented the University of Louisiana at Lafayette during the 2013–14 NCAA Division I men's basketball season. The Ragin' Cajuns, led by fourth year head coach Bob Marlin, played their home games at the Cajundome and were members of the Sun Belt Conference. They finished the season 23–12, 11–7 in Sun Belt play to finish in third place. They were champions of the Sun Belt Conference tournament to earn an automatic bid to the NCAA tournament where they lost in the second round to Creighton.

Roster

Schedule

|-
!colspan=12 style="background:#E34234; color:#FFFFFF;"| Exhibition

|-
!colspan=12 style="background:#E34234; color:#FFFFFF;"| Regular season

|-
!colspan=9 style="background:#E34234; color:#FFFFFF;"| Sun Belt tournament

|-
!colspan=9 style="background:#E34234; color:#FFFFFF;"| NCAA tournament

References

Louisiana Ragin' Cajuns men's basketball seasons
Louisiana-Lafayette
Louisiana-Lafayette
Louisiana
Louisiana